A total of sixty-nine poems, sixty short stories, and three serials were published in Asia Raya, a newspaper in the Dutch East Indies and early Indonesia. First published on 29 April 1942, months after the Empire of Japan invaded the Indies, Asia Raya was established under the occupation government and intended as a vehicle for pro-Japanese propaganda – including literature. Run by both Japanese and native staff, the newspaper remained in publication until 7 September 1945, closing less than a month after Indonesia proclaimed its independence.

During the occupation, the Japanese overlords enacted censorship standards, which Asia Raya – as an organ of the occupying forces – followed strictly. Writers looking to have their works published were limited in themes they could select by the Institute for People's Education and Cultural Guidance (in Indonesian, ; in Japanese) in the capital at Jakarta. They were told that works dealing with internal struggle or otherwise depressing topics would "poison" society with confusion and despair. Instead, writers hoping to be published had to focus on positive themes in an effort to instill positive traits in society; by the end of the occupation, this meant a nationalistic struggle. To subvert these policies, writers often hid more personal anti-colonial subtexts in their works.

Asia Raya contributors were Japanese or native, with the latter more active; works by two foreign authors, Rabindranath Tagore and Mahatma Gandhi, were also published in translation. The single most-published writer in Asia Raya was Rosihan Anwar, a recent senior high school graduate, who published seven poems and nine short stories while working for the newspaper. Andjar Asmara, a former film director, published the most serials; both of his serials were based on films he had made before the occupation.

The following list is divided into three tables, one for poems, one for short stories, and one for serials; the tables are initially arranged alphabetically by title, although they are also sortable. Author's names are given as recorded in Asia Raya, with explanatory notes indicating pseudonyms where known. Titles are given in the original spelling, with a literal English translation underneath. Dates, originally in the Japanese kōki (皇紀) calendar, are given in the Gregorian calendar.


Poems

Short stories

Serials

Explanatory notes

Footnotes

Works cited

 

Dutch East Indies
Lists of publications
Propaganda in Indonesia
World War II propaganda